The 1903 Colorado Agricultural Aggies football team represented Colorado Agricultural College (now known as Colorado State University) in the Colorado Football Association (CFA) during the 1903 college football season In their first and only season under head coach Matt Rothwell, the Aggies compiled a 5–1 record (3–1 against CFA opponents), finished second in the conference, and outscored all opponents by a total of 67 to 24.

Schedule

References

Colorado Agricultural
Colorado State Rams football seasons
Colorado Agricultural Aggies football